Celerena mutata is a moth of the family Geometridae first described by Francis Walker in 1865. It is found in New Guinea.

References

Desmobathrinae
Moths of New Guinea